Pleurotomella orthocolpa is an extinct species of sea snail, a marine gastropod mollusk in the family Raphitomidae.

Description

Distribution
Fossils of this marine species were found in Eocene strata of Loire-Atlantique, France.

References

 Cossmann (M.), 1919 Supplément aux mollusques éocèniques de la Loire-Inférieure. Bulletin de la Société des Sciences Naturelles de l'Ouest de la France, sér. 3, t. 5, p. 53-141

orthocolpa
Gastropods described in 1902